This article needs citations to reliable sources.

Cavaspongiidae is a family of radiolarians in the order Spumellaria.

External links

Polycystines
Radiolarian families